The People's Republic of China Passport, commonly referred to as the Chinese passport,  is a passport issued to citizens of the People's Republic of China (PRC) for the purpose of international travel, and entitles its bearer to the protection of China's consular officials overseas.

On 1 July 2011, the Ministry of Foreign Affairs of the People's Republic of China launched a trial issuance of e-passports for individuals conducting public affairs work overseas on behalf of the Chinese government. The face, fingerprints, and other biometric features of the passport holder is digitized and stored in pre-installed contactless smart chip, along with "the passport owner's name, sex and personal photo as well as the passport's term of validity and [the] digital certificate of the chip". Ordinary biometric passports were introduced by the Ministry of Public Security on 15 May 2012. As of January 2015, all new passports issued by China are biometric e-passports, and non-biometric passports are no longer issued.

In 2012, over 38 million Chinese citizens held ordinary passports, comprising only 2.86 percent of the total population at the time. In 2014, China issued 16 million passports, ranking first in the world, surpassing the United States (14 million) and India (10 million). The number of ordinary passports in circulation rose to 120 million by October 2016, which was approximately 8.7 percent of the population. As of April 2017 to date, China had issued over 100 million biometric ordinary passports.

Overview and contents

Types
Articles 3, 4, 5 and 8 of the Passport Law of the People's Republic of China, which went into effect in 2007, declares three types of passports issued in Mainland China:
 Ordinary passports are issued to citizens who intend to go abroad for non-official purposes, such as taking up residence in other countries, visiting relatives, studying, working, travelling or engaging in business activities. They are issued by the Exit & Entry Administration of the Ministry of Public Security (MPS), the foreign missions of the People's Republic of China, or other missions overseas authorized to do so by the Ministry of Foreign Affairs.
 Diplomatic passports are issued to diplomats, consuls and their spouses or children who are minor, as well as to diplomatic couriers. They are issued by the Ministry of Foreign Affairs (MFA).
 Service passports are issued to employees who are dispatched by the Chinese government to work for Chinese foreign missions, the United Nations or its special commissions, or other international organizations, as well as their spouses or minor children. They are issued by the MFA, foreign missions of the People's Republic of China, other missions overseas authorized by the MFA, or the Foreign Affairs Offices under the governments of provinces, autonomous regions, municipalities directly under the Central Government and cities divided into districts authorized by the MFA.
 A special variation of the service passport, called the Passport for Public Affairs, is issued to public servants who "lead divisions or equivalents" of county or state-owned companies, and employees of state-controlled companies.

Article 9 of the Law states that the "issuing scope of diplomatic passports and service passports, the measures for issue of such passports, their terms of validity and the specific categories of service passports shall be prescribed by the Ministry of Foreign Affairs".

The ordinary passport is considered a passport "for private affairs", while service (including for public affairs passports) and diplomatic passports are passports "for public affairs".

The passports for Macau and Hong Kong SARs are issued and regulated by the governments of these regions, and are therefore not covered by this law.

In July 2011 the Chinese government began to issue biometric diplomatic passports, service passports and passports for public affairs. The launch date of biometric ordinary passports was May 15, 2012.

Passport for public affairs
A different passport for public affairs was issued until 2006. Unlike the current version, it was classified as a variation of ordinary passport. The abuse of the use of document resulted in its subsequent cancellation. Unlike other passports, it was issued by the provincial or municipal Foreign Affairs Offices, rather than the Ministry of Foreign Affairs or the Ministry of Public Security. Chinese ordinary passport for public affairs was used in the ends of 1980s and 1990s. The passport information was written by hands, and these ordinary passports were usually valid for 2 or 5 years.

In 1996, 77% of persons exiting China held a passport for public affairs. The rate had dropped to 39% by 2002. The reason for the high rate of usage was because the passport for public affairs offered more visa-free countries, such as Russia, than the ordinary passport. Chinese regulations require public affairs passports to be kept in the possession of the holder's work unit, and they must be surrendered by the individual within one month of returning to China.

Validity

The passport previously had an across-the-board 5-year period of validity. Since 2007, ordinary passports are valid for 10 years for bearers above 16 years of age, and for 5 years for bearers below 16 years of age, and diplomatic or service passports are valid for 4 years. According to the 2006 Passport Law of the People's Republic of China, renewal of previously issued passports ended on January 1, 2007. However, passports renewed before 2007 remained valid until expiry.

Format
The newest version of the regular Chinese passport is the biometric version, which replaced its predecessors "Form 92", "Form 97-1" and "Form 97-2", but Form "97-2" passport is still being issued for single group tourism to Russia in some Sino-Russia broder cities and valid for only 3 months or after returning to China. It was released to the general public in May 2012. The passport contains 48 pages.

Ordinary Passport - Inside

Version "1982"
The Form "1982" ordinary Chinese passport is a hand-written passport and issued in 1982. Chinese, French and English are used in all pages.

Version "1992"
The Form "1992" ordinary Chinese passport is a machine-readable passport, and issued in 1992.

Version "1997-1"

Version "1997-2"

The Form "97-2" ordinary Chinese passport is a machine-readable passport, and issued in February 1997.
In "97-2", personal data is on the inside front cover along with a coloured photo printed with inkjet printer, with a protective film covering most of the data page. Details include:
 Passport code (P)
 Country Code (CHN)
 Passport number (G########) - consists of one letter indicating passport type (G = ordinary), followed by eight digits
 Surname
 Given Names
 Sex (M/F)
 Date of birth (DD.MMM.YYYY)
 Date of issue (DD.MMM.YYYY)
 Place of birth (Province, or city/province/state if born abroad)
 Place of issue (Province, or city/province/state of diplomatic/consular authority if issued abroad)
 Date of expiry (DD.MMM.YYYY)
 Authority ("National Immigration Administration, PRC" for single travel or "Exit & Entry Administration, Ministry of Public Security" or the Chinese diplomatic and consular mission)
 Machine Readable Code

Biometric passport

In the biometric Passport, the personal data page was moved to a separate sheet of paper, and the design of personal data page has been amended significantly, adding the full name of PRC in Simplified Chinese and English on top along with an e-passport symbol printed with optically variable ink. New security features include a second ghost image of the holder and additional holographic graphs including the PRC emblem and the laser-printed world map. The details included are as follows:
 Passport code (P)
 Country Code (CHN)
 Passport number (E########) - consists of one letter indicating passport type (E = e-passport), followed by eight digits. As of April 2017, over 100 million ordinary biometric passports had been issued and old E+8 digits type passport numbers had been used up. So the number format has been extended by using the second digit and replacing it with the English letters in order (except I, O) the third digit is still Arabic numerals, and the total number of digits is still 9. New passport numbers started with EA0000001 (two letters with seven digits).
 Name (Chinese characters on top, Pinyin transcription on bottom, a comma separates surname and given names in Pinyin only)
 Sex (M/F)
 Nationality (Chinese)
 Date of birth (DD.MMM.YYYY)
 Place of birth (Province with romanized transcription, or the country code if born abroad, along with Chinese abbreviation of the country)
 Date of issue (DD.MMM.YYYY, month is transcribed into Arabic numerals)
 Place of issue (Province, or city of diplomatic/consular authority if issued abroad)
 Date of expiry (DD.MMM.YYYY, month is transcribed into Arabic numerals)
 Authority ("National Immigration Administration, PRC" or the full name of the Chinese diplomatic/consular authority，if issuing in mainland China before June 2019 it may be "MPS Exit & Entry Administration")
 Bearer's signature
 Machine Readable Code

Languages

All information is printed in Simplified Chinese and English, except for the "Attentions" page, which is only printed in Simplified Chinese.

Passport Note 

 In Chinese

 In English

 In French (On version 82 only)

If the passport is for single travel, a valid notice will printed in Simplified Chinese and English on this page.

On version "97-1" and "97-2", it is on page 1. On the biometric version, it is moved to page 3.

Inner pages

In the biometric version, selected nature hotspots and famous sights of mainland China, Hong Kong, Macau and Taiwan are printed in the inner pages, each page also contains a transparent watermark of another nature hotspots and famous sights in the same area.

Last page

The last page has the notes for the passport. For e-passport, inside the backcover, a caution for the biometric chip is written in both Chinese and English:

This passport contains sensitive electronics. For best performance, please do not bend, perforate or expose to extreme temperatures or excess moisture.  DO NOT STAMP HERE

Fee and processing time
The fee for a Chinese passport is CNY 120. When applying for a passport overseas, the fee is US$25 or €20. No extra fees are charged for expedited processing if approved.

Normal processing time is 10 business days when applying from Mainland China, and 15 business days from Chinese diplomatic missions outside Mainland China (including Hong Kong and Macau). In some Regions, processing time is 7 business days such as Shanghai City if application was submitted electronically (online or by cell phone APPs such as WeChat). Expedited processing is available for 5 business days, but is only available if the applicants have genuine emergencies, such as they have deceased relatives abroad, their first day of school is near, or they have unused visas in old passports that are expiring soon.

Special administrative region passports 

Chinese citizens who are also permanent residents of Hong Kong or Macau Special Administrative Regions of China are issued Hong Kong or Macau SAR passports by the respective immigration departments of the two SARs. In Hong Kong, Hong Kong Immigration Department takes charge of issuing passports. In Macau, Identification Services Bureau does the same role. The SAR passports and travel documents are issued solely by the government of the SARs, and the designs differ from that of the regular mainland passport, albeit all three passports bear the same country and nationality code, CHN, meaning that the bearer holds the People's Republic of China nationality, as well as the message from Ministry of Foreign Affairs of China.

Some countries  classify Chinese citizens with SAR passports as Hong Kong citizens or Macau citizens for visa issuing purpose, other than the ordinary Chinese citizens classifications. Holders of SAR passports enjoy visa-free entry to many more countries than holders of regular PRC passports.

While the SAR passports and travel documents are endorsed by China, mainland ports of entry controlled by the Ministry of Public Security do not accept those documents for entrance into Mainland China as both the Mainland and the two SARs are within the same country. MPS requires SAR residents of Chinese nationality to use a Home Return Permit or Chinese Travel Document for SAR residents residing overseas. Also, SAR passports are not required when travelling between two SARs, but residents should bring their permanent residence IDs.

Chinese citizens who are not permanent residents of Hong Kong AND are without household registration in Mainland China are issued Hong Kong Document of Identity for Visa Purposes, and of Macau Macao Special Administrative Region Travel Permit or Visit Permit for Resident of Macao to HKSAR.

Non-passport travel documents
The following travel documents are also issued by mainland China to Chinese citizens who may or may not qualify for a Chinese passport for various reasons:

Chinese Travel Document
The People's Republic of China Travel Document is a type of travel document issued by Chinese embassies, consulates, and other foreign offices to Chinese citizens for their international travel to China and other countries. The bearer of the Travel Document is legally defined a Chinese citizen in accordance with the Nationality Law.

The Travel Document is issued to Chinese nationals in situations when it is inconvenient or unnecessary to be issued a People's Republic of China passport.

Exit-Entry Permit for Travelling to and from Hong Kong and Macau

The Exit-Entry Permit for Travelling to and from Hong Kong and Macau, also known as the Two-way Permit, is issued to Chinese citizens with hukou who only wish to visit Hong Kong and Macau.

Permit for Proceeding to Hong Kong and Macao

The Permit for Proceeding to Hong Kong and Macao, also known as the One-way Permit, is issued to Chinese citizens who are settling in Hong Kong or Macau and have relinquished their Chinese residency (hukou). After their initial entry to Hong Kong or Macau, they are considered as SAR residents and are permanently ineligible for an ordinary Chinese passport, and later they will be eligible for SAR passports if they acquire a permanent resident status in the respective SARs.

Travel Permit to and from Taiwan
The Travel Permit to and from Taiwan, colloquially known as Mainland Compatriot Permit or Mainland Resident Travel Permit, is issued to Chinese citizens with hukou in Mainland China by Ministry of Public Security, to those who wish to travel directly between Mainland China and Taiwan. Holders of the permit are required to obtain exit endorsements issued by MPS and Exit and Entry Permit issued by Taiwanese authorities prior to traveling. This permit as well as a valid exit endorsement (except for Group Tourist Endorsement) is still required even if only transiting through Taiwan without leaving the sterile area of the airport when departing from airports of Mainland China except for Chongqing, Nanchang, or Kunming. Exit and Entry Permit is not required, however, when not leaving the sterile area of Taoyuan Airport on transit to the third place regardless of the city of departure.

Self-Service Immigration System (e-Channel)
Holders of Chinese biometric Passports are eligible to use the Self-Service Immigration System, or e-Channel. E-Channel are located throughout numerous international airports in Mainland China (including these top 10 busiest international gateways: Beijing Capital International Airport, Shanghai Pudong International Airport, Shanghai Hongqiao International Airport, Guangzhou Baiyun International Airport and Chongqing Jiangbei International Airport) as well as land border crossing checkpoints in Shenzhen and Zhuhai. e-Channel was first introduced for self-entry, i.e. for Chinese biometric passport holders return to China from Outside destinations. In order to use the e-Channel, they must hold biometric passports with their fingerprint data pre-recorded on the biometric chip. If their biometric passports do not contain fingerprint data, they must first register with China Immigration Inspection (CII) at land border checkpoints or international airports to be eligible.

Starting from August 19, 2016, passengers are able to use the e-Gates in terminal 2 of Beijing Capital International Airport to complete exit procedures from China as well.

Starting from Dec 1, 2017, Shanghai international airports including PVG and SHA both have e-Channel for exit.

Eligibility
The extended list of eligible travelers is:

Registration with CII not required:
 Holders of biometric passports that contain fingerprint data;
 Holders of the new biometric Two-way Permits with valid entry endorsements that contain fingerprint data.

Registration with CII required:
 Holders of the booklet-style Two-way Permits with multiple-entry endorsements;
 Holders of Travel Permit to and from Taiwan for Mainland Residents booklet with multiple-exit endorsements;
 Holders of Exit and Entry Permits that are valid for one year and multiple entries (only for the specific port of entry that they have registered with);
 Holders of Home Return Permits;
 Holders of Taiwan Compatriot Permits;
 Foreign nationals with their passports and Chinese Permanent Resident cards;
 Foreign nationals with their biometric passports and residence permits with a validity of more than 6 months; and
 Flight crew members serving scheduled flights who are either Chinese or visa-exempt nationals, or non-visa-exempt nationals holding crew or work visas or residence permits that are valid for at least 1 year.

Visa requirements

Visa requirements for Chinese citizens are administrative entry restrictions by the authorities of other states placed on citizens of the People's Republic of China. According to the 1 January 2018 Henley visa restrictions index, holders of a Chinese passport are granted visa free or visa on arrival access to 70 countries and territories, ranking the Chinese passport 68th in the world  Chinese passport is also the highest-ranked passport among Communist states. Before February 2014, Chinese immigration authorities did not generally allow mainland Chinese citizens to board outbound flights without a valid visa for the destination country, even if the destination country granted a visa on arrival to Chinese passport holders, unless the exit was approved by the Ministry of Public Security. Exceptions were possible if the traveller had a third country's visa and a connecting flight from the destination country to the third country.
The Electronic Visa Update System (EVUS) is introduced in 2016 for Chinese passport holder who hold a valid 10-year B1, B2, or B1/B2 visa to travel to the United States.

Travel to and from Hong Kong, Macau, or Taiwan
Issued to Chinese citizens with Hukou or Chinese citizens not qualified for SAR-issued travel documents, Chinese passports cannot normally be used when travelling directly to Hong Kong, Macau, or Taiwan from Mainland China.

In order for such Chinese citizens to travel from Mainland China to Hong Kong and Macau, a Two-way Permit is required. Chinese foreign missions, however, do issue visa-like Hong Kong SAR Entry Permits for up to 14 days to Chinese citizens residing outside Mainland China upon request, so PRC passport holders can travel solely between Hong Kong and Mainland with passports. Chinese passports can be used when transiting through Hong Kong or Macau to other countries and can enter Hong Kong or Macau for 7 days without a visa.

Travelling to Taiwan from Mainland China requires the Travel Permit to and from Taiwan as well as Exit and Entry Permit issued by the Taiwanese government. Although Chinese passports are accepted as valid travel documents by the National Immigration Agency (NIA) and Taiwanese diplomatic missions, the NIA does not allow Chinese citizens with hukou to travel to Taiwan when departing from Mainland China unless holding the Mainland Resident Travel Permit with valid exit endorsement.

Cross border travel statistics 
These are the numbers of mainland Chinese visitors to various countries or territories:

Gallery

See also
 Chinese Travel Document
 Hong Kong SAR passport
 List of passports
 Macau SAR passport
 Nationality law of the People's Republic of China
 Taiwan passport
 Resident Identity Card, the national identification card for Chinese citizens.
 Visa requirements for Chinese citizens
 People's Republic of China Marriage Certificate

References

External links

 Text of the 2006 Passport Law of the People's Republic of China

Passports by country
Chinese passports
Passport